Ian Michael Merrien (born 1973) is a Guernsey international lawn bowler.

Bowls career
Merrien has represented Guernsey at three Commonwealth Games; in the singles at the 2002 Commonwealth Games, in the triples at the 2006 Commonwealth Games and in the pairs at the 2014 Commonwealth Games.

In 2007, he won the triples bronze medal at the Atlantic Bowls Championships.

Personal life
He is married to world champion bowler Alison Merrien.

References

1973 births
Living people
Guernsey male bowls players
Bowls players at the 2002 Commonwealth Games
Bowls players at the 2006 Commonwealth Games
Bowls players at the 2010 Commonwealth Games